This stadium was established in 1993 with the help and influence of d. Luis Hernandez Salazar C.c. cova. Who also founded the Sporting Machado Deportivo F.C and was an active member of the C.S. Barbareño between 1970 and 1980.

In this room you have played several finals of the second B (ANAFA) and Second Division of Costa Rica where the majority of the times the local club has won.

It is a multi-use stadium in Santa Bárbara, Costa Rica. It is currently used mostly for football matches and is the home stadium of Asociación Deportiva Carmelita. The stadium holds 2,000 people.

References
 Santa Bárbara
 Comité Cantonal de Deportes-Municipalidad de Santa Bárbara
 AD Barbareña
 AD Barbareña

Carlos Alvarado
Buildings and structures in Heredia Province